Han Hyong-il (born 1960) is a North Korean former footballer. He represented North Korea on at least twenty-five occasions between 1980 and 1990, scoring six times.

Managerial career
Han was appointed head coach of the North Korea national football team in 2005.

Career statistics

International

International goals
Scores and results list North Korea's goal tally first, score column indicates score after each North Korea goal.

References

1960 births
Living people
North Korean footballers
North Korean football managers
North Korea national football team managers
North Korea international footballers
Association football forwards
Footballers at the 1982 Asian Games
Footballers at the 1990 Asian Games
Asian Games competitors for North Korea